Södertälje Syd (Södertälje South) is a major, but not the most centrally located, railway station in Södertälje, Sweden. It is located on top of the 2 km long Igelsta Bridge.

Regional and intercity trains for destinations such as Stockholm, Göteborg, Malmö, Copenhagen, Oslo, Linköping and Eskilstuna stop at the station.

The local Södertälje–Stockholm commuter train, however, goes from central Södertälje, and the central station has by far more passengers than Södertälje Syd. There are also local commuter trains central Södertälje–Gnesta with relatively sparse frequency, stopping at Södertälje Syd, under the Igelsta Bridge with escalator link. With 300 boardings on a winter weekday in 2019, the commuter rail station is the third least used on the Stockholm commuter rail network, only surpassed by Hemfosa and Krigslida on the Nynäs Line. Considerably more board the regional and intercity trains.

References

Södertälje Municipality
Railway stations in Stockholm County
Railway stations opened in 1995
1995 establishments in Sweden